Bernard Thébault (born 10 January 1943) is a French boxer. He competed in the men's light heavyweight event at the 1964 Summer Olympics.

References

1943 births
Living people
French male boxers
Olympic boxers of France
Boxers at the 1964 Summer Olympics
Sportspeople from Argenteuil
Light-heavyweight boxers